Shen Yaqin (born 11 December 1990) is a visually impaired Paralympian athlete from China competing mainly in T12 classification events. Shen won a gold medal at her first Summer Paralympics, the 2016 Rio Games, in the women's 4 × 100 metres relay.

Notes

External links
 

1990 births
Living people
Chinese female sprinters
Paralympic athletes of China
Athletes (track and field) at the 2016 Summer Paralympics
Paralympic gold medalists for China
Medalists at the 2016 Summer Paralympics
Paralympic medalists in athletics (track and field)
21st-century Chinese women